Essen/Mülheim Airport , is a minor unscheduled airport located  south-west of Essen and  south-east of Mülheim, North Rhine-Westphalia. It serves the western Rhine-Ruhr area, the largest urban agglomeration in Germany.

Airlines and destinations
There are no scheduled flights to or from the airport, it is mainly used for general aviation and business charters. The nearest passenger airports are Düsseldorf Airport and Dortmund Airport.

See also
 Transport in Germany
 List of airports in Germany

References

External links

 
 

Essen
Buildings and structures in North Rhine-Westphalia
Essen